Sandra Rodriguez V.  (born ) was a Peruvian female volleyball player. She was part of the Peru women's national volleyball team.

She competed at the 1996 Summer Olympics, and the 1994 FIVB Volleyball Women's World Championship. On club level she played with Latino Amisa.

Clubs
 Latino Amisa (1994)

References

External links
>

1974 births
Living people
Peruvian women's volleyball players
Place of birth missing (living people)
Volleyball players at the 1996 Summer Olympics
Olympic volleyball players of Peru
Pan American Games medalists in volleyball
Pan American Games bronze medalists for Peru
Medalists at the 1991 Pan American Games
20th-century Peruvian women
21st-century Peruvian women